The Ministry of Constitutional and Parliamentary Affairs is a government ministry, responsible for constitutional development and the legislature in Zimbabwe. The incumbent is Eric Matinenga. It oversees:
 House of Assembly of Zimbabwe
 Senate of Zimbabwe

References

Government of Zimbabwe
Parliamentary affairs ministries